Nelson Peak is a 1,605 m peak in Antarctica, standing at the eastern end of Drury Ridge and Brown Ridge where the two ridges abut Washington Escarpment, in the Neptune Range, Pensacola Mountains. It was mapped by the United States Geological Survey (USGS) from surveys and U.S. Navy air photos from 1956 to 1966. It was named by the Advisory Committee on Antarctic Names (US-ACAN) for Willis H. Nelson, a geologist with the Neptune Range field party of 1963–64.

Mountains of Queen Elizabeth Land
Pensacola Mountains